Mark Edward Freitas Ice Forum is a 2,000-seat hockey rink in Storrs, Connecticut. It is the home arena for the University of Connecticut women's and practice facility of men's college ice hockey teams.  It opened on November 7, 1998, replacing the outdoor UConn Ice Arena, which was in use since the 1960s.  The Forum was constructed as part of the UCONN 2000 commitment by the State of Connecticut to help rebuild, renew, and enhance the campuses of the University of Connecticut. It was opened in time for the hockey team's elevation to Division I status.  The arena was used for the 2000 MAAC Championship (won by UConn), the 2001 MAAC tournament, and the 2002 ECAC women's hockey tournament. It  hosted the 2008 Hockey East Women's Tournament. The building was named for Mark E. Freitas '81, a former hockey letter winner and benefactor, on February 5, 2005.

The men's hockey team had used the venue for home games prior to them becoming the newest member of Hockey East in 2014, but have since moved to the XL Center in Hartford, Connecticut, as their primary arena. As of the 2015–16 season they currently play all home games at the XL Center, which has a hockey capacity of 15,635. For the duration of the 2020–21 season, the men's team reverted to using the forum due to the COVID-19 pandemic. 

The 2021–22 women's season is expected to be UConn's last in the Forum. UConn has begun construction on a new 2,600-seat on-campus arena that will be home to both the men's and women's varsity hockey programs upon its opening, planned for the 2022–23 season. UConn will continue to use the Forum as a practice facility for the varsity teams and the home ice of its club hockey teams.

References

External links
 UConn Athletics: Facilities

UConn Huskies ice hockey
College ice hockey venues in the United States
Indoor ice hockey venues in the United States
Sports venues in Tolland County, Connecticut
UConn Huskies sports venues
1998 establishments in Connecticut
Sports venues completed in 1998